Kyzyl-Beyit is a village in the Jalal-Abad Region of Kyrgyzstan. It is part of the Aksy District. Its population was 342 in 2021.

References

External links
 (in Russian)

Populated places in Jalal-Abad Region